Henry Harden may refer to:

 Henry Eric Harden (1912–1945), English recipient of the Victoria Cross
 Henry Scott Harden (1835–1879), member of the Queensland Legislative Council